Blast from Your Past is a compilation album by English rock musician Ringo Starr, released on Apple Records in 1975. It is both Starr's first compilation LP and his final release under his contract with EMI. It was also the last album to be released on the Beatles' Apple label until it was revived in the 1990s.

The album provides an overview of Starr's most successful period as a solo artist. The songs include his RIAA gold-certified singles "It Don't Come Easy", "Photograph" and "You're Sixteen", and other international hits such as "Back Off Boogaloo" and "Only You". The album peaked at number 30 on the US Billboard pop LPs chart but failed to chart in the UK.

Content
Blast from Your Past provides an overview of Starr's musical achievements as a solo artist during the first half of the 1970s. The album compiles eight singles, one B-side, and one album track, all released between 1970 and 1975. All eight of the singles charted on the Billboard Hot 100 in the US; "Photograph" and "You're Sixteen" each hit number 1, while all of them but "Beaucoups of Blues" made the top ten. Five of the songs charted in the United Kingdom, where the non-album single "Back Off Boogaloo" was the highest placed, at number 2. "Early 1970" was the B-side to "It Don't Come Easy", another non-album single, and "I'm the Greatest" was taken from the album Ringo. "Oh My My", "Photograph" and "You're Sixteen" were taken from Ringo also, and "No No Song" and "Only You (And You Alone)" first appeared on Goodnight Vienna.

Release and reception
The album was released in the US on 20 November 1975, and 12 December in the UK. The latter was issued with a red Apple label. The sleeve for the album was designed by Roy Kohara. In the UK, Apple issued "Oh My My", backed with "No No Song", as a single on 9 January 1976, to promote the compilation and also because both of the songs had appeared there only as album tracks. As with John Lennon's recently released Apple compilation, Shaved Fish, the sales of Blast from Your Past were disappointing. The album failed to chart in the UK and peaked at number 30 in the US.

In his review for the NME, Bob Woffinden wrote that few observers would have expected Starr to have amassed enough hit songs for a greatest hits set five years after the Beatles' break-up, given that he had sung and written little during the band's career. Woffinden criticised the brevity of the album, however, and said that, since only four of the tracks had been significant chart successes in the UK, and many of the songs had not been issued as singles there, "why should [Starr] now consider an album of American 45s a going proposition in Britain?" Writing in their book The Beatles: An Illustrated Record, Roy Carr and Tony Tyler also commented on its "short weight" nature, saying: "the tracks total no more than half-an-hour. Both sides together, that is."

Blast from Your Past was reissued in the US by Capitol Records in September 1981, while in the UK it was released by the budget label Music for Pleasure on 25 November 1981. The album was issued on compact disc in the UK on 26 May 1987 and in the US on 18 January 1988.

All the tracks from Blast from Your Past appear on Starr's 2007 career-spanning compilation album Photograph: The Very Best of Ringo Starr.

Track listing

Charts

See also
Shaved Fish
The Best of George Harrison
Wings Greatest

References
 Footnotes

 Citations

External links
JPGR's Blast from Your Past site

1975 greatest hits albums
Albums produced by Richard Perry
Albums produced by George Harrison
Ringo Starr compilation albums
Apple Records compilation albums
Albums produced by Ringo Starr
Albums recorded at Sunset Sound Recorders
Albums recorded at A&M Studios
Albums recorded at Apple Studios